The Wisconsin State Federation of Labor (WSFL), affiliated with the American Federation of Labor, was the largest federation of labor unions in Wisconsin, from its formation in 1893 at the behest of the Milwaukee Federated Trades Council to its 1958 merger with the smaller CIO-affiliated Wisconsin State Industrial Council to form the Wisconsin AFL-CIO.

A number of WSFL leaders were also elected to public office in Wisconsin, in part due to its roots in and alliance with the Socialist Party, especially Milwaukee's so-called Sewer Socialists.

Notable WSFL activists 
Victor Berger: editor/publisher of one of the WSFL's two official newspapers, and Socialist Congressman
Andrew Biemiller: professor, editor, Socialist (later Progressive) legislator, WSFL union organizer (hired to supplement his meagre legislative salary), Democratic Congressman, and union lobbyist
Frederick Brockhausen: cigar maker, WSFL official and Socialist state legislator
Charles Burhop: cigar maker, WSFL delegate, and Socialist state legislator
William Coleman: house painter, union organizer, WSFL board member, and Socialist state legislator
Arthur Kahn: baker, union activist and organizer, and Socialist state legislator 
Frank Metcalfe: glassblower, WSFL board member, Socialist state legislator and nominee for Governor of Wisconsin
Henry Ohl, Jr., WSFL official and Socialist state legislator  
Joseph Arthur Padway: labor lawyer, legal counsel for WSFL, Socialist state senator, and later first general counsel of the American Federation of Labor
L. W. Rogers: teacher, railway brakeman, union officer and organizer, Socialist political activist, and newspaper editor, one of the founders of the WSFL
Carl Sandburg: reporter, writer, editor, poet, and WSFL delegate
George J. Schneider: papermaker, vice-president of the International Brotherhood of Paper Makers, WSFL board member and Republican (later Progressive) Congressman
David Sigman: pro-labor Progressive state legislator who was hired as a WSFL staffer to supplement his meagre legislative salary
Frank J. Weber: seaman, union organizer, first president of the WSFL, and Socialist state legislator

See also 
Texas State Federation of Labor
Pennsylvania Federation of Labor

References 

1893 establishments in Wisconsin
1958 disestablishments in Wisconsin
Trade unions established in 1893
Trade unions disestablished in 1958
State wide trade unions in the United States
 
Trade unions in Wisconsin